The Oregon Vietnam Veterans Memorial is an  outdoor war memorial dedicated to Oregonians who served in the Vietnam War. The memorial was dedicated in 1987, inspired in 1982 by visits to the national Vietnam Veterans Memorial by five veterans and the parents of a Marine killed in Vietnam. Landscape architecture firm Walker Macy of Portland designed the memorial, while construction labor and materials were almost entirely volunteer donations.The font used in the memorial was created for the exclusive use of the Memorial. It was designed by Janis Price, and is called Hoyt, in recognition of the Arboretum. 

The memorial is located in the Hoyt Arboretum, adjacent to the World Forestry Center and the Oregon Zoo.  The nearby trail system connects to Forest Park and is close to the International Rose Test Garden and the Portland Japanese Garden. It is accessible by U.S. Route 26 and by Portland's MAX light rail system, which has a station in Washington Park.

Gallery

See also
 Oregon Korean War Memorial

References

External links

 Portland Parks & Recreation site page
 Walker Macy site page
 Pictorial 1
   Pictorial 2

1987 establishments in Oregon
Landmarks in Oregon
Monuments and memorials in Portland, Oregon
Vietnam War monuments and memorials in the United States
Tourist attractions in Portland, Oregon
Washington Park (Portland, Oregon)